The Royal Lodge or The Royal Villa (Norwegian: Kongsseteren, The King's Seter) is located in Holmenkollen in Oslo, Norway, and is in the Norwegian royal family's private possession. The property is used mainly in winter, and the royal family usually celebrates Christmas there, and stays at the Royal Lodge during the Holmenkollen Ski Festival every year.
 
King Haakon VII and Queen Maud received the Royal Lodge as a gift from the Norwegian people for the coronation in 1906. It was financed by a fundraising campaign. The villa was designed by architect Kristian Hjalmar Biong, who won the architectural competition with their project "Slot over Slot." Some of the details are taken from the Norwegian stabbur tradition, especially the corners of the building. Otherwise, the character of the neo-baroque style with some elements of Art Nouveau. The Baroque can be found particularly in the gable walls symmetrical plant ornamentation in strong colors, which is inspired by Norwegian wood carving art in the 18th century.  The Royal Lodge was completed in 1911.

King Olav V of Norway was often residing at The Royal Lodge. On 17 January 1991, while staying in The Royal Lodge, he became ill and died there.

References

External links 
 Royal Lodge at the Norwegian Royal Family's Official Website

Holmenkollen
Houses completed in 1911
Buildings and structures in Oslo
H
National Romantic architecture in Norway
Art Nouveau architecture in Oslo
Art Nouveau houses
1911 establishments in Norway